Aigondigné is a commune in the department of Deux-Sèvres, western France. The municipality was established on 1 January 2019 by merger of the former communes of Aigonnay, Mougon-Thorigné and Sainte-Blandine. Mougon-Thorigné was the result of the merger, on 1 January 2017, of the former communes of Mougon and Thorigné.

See also 
Communes of the Deux-Sèvres department

References 

Communes of Deux-Sèvres
Populated places established in 2019
2019 establishments in France